Henry Nicholas may refer to:

Henry Nicholas  (born 1959), American businessman
Henry James Nicholas, VC recipient
Henry Nicholis (Hendrik Nicholis, Hendrik Niclaes or Heinrich Niclaes), 16th century Christian mystic

See also

Harry Nicholas, trade unionist